The Findlay–Tiffin, Ohio, combined statistical area includes the counties of Hancock and Seneca in the U.S. state of Ohio. As of the 2000 Census, the population of the combined statistical area was 131,079.

Hancock County, Ohio
Seneca County, Ohio
Combined statistical areas of the United States